Milbank LLP (commonly known as Milbank) is an international law firm headquartered in New York City. It also has offices in Washington, D.C., Los Angeles, London, Frankfurt, Munich, Tokyo, Hong Kong, São Paulo, Seoul, Singapore, and Beijing.

History
Milbank's roots are traced back to 1866, with the inception of the original firm, Anderson, Adams & Young set up in 1866 and then as Murray & Aldrich merged in April 1929, with Webb, Patterson & Hadley to become Murray, Aldrich & Webb. In 1931, the firm merged with Masten & Nichols to become Milbank, Tweed, Hope & Webb. The name was changed in 1962 to Milbank, Tweed, Hadley & McCloy.
For decades, the firm's biggest clients were the Rockefeller family and the Chase Manhattan Bank.

The firm was responsible for the legal work on the building of Rockefeller Center, and up until 2018, had offices located at One Chase Manhattan Plaza, which was later readdressed 28 Liberty, in 2015. After World War II the firm advised new commercial and industrial developments.
Milbank created hedge funds and other investment vehicles for financial clients in the 1960s, 1970s and 1980s, and capitalized on the growth of international business, finance, and technology transactions in the 1990s. Today, Milbank has offices in financial centers including London, Frankfurt, Munich, Seoul, Tokyo, Singapore, Hong Kong and Beijing, in addition to domestic offices in Los Angeles and Washington, D.C.

On February 19, 2019, Milbank changed its name from Milbank, Tweed, Hadley & McCloy LLP to Milbank LLP.

Name partner

Albert G. Milbank

Albert G. Milbank had been a partner in the firm of Masten & Nichols; when that firm merged with Murray, Aldrich & Webb, he became a senior partner of the newly formed Milbank, Tweed, Hope & Webb. While a partner of the firm, Mr. Milbank was also a member of the board of directors of the Welfare Board of New York City and Greater New York, as well as of the New York War Fund and the National Institute of Social Science. He was a trustee emeritus of Princeton University and a trustee of the Pierpont Morgan Library. Among the many honors he received was that of Honorary Commander of the Most Excellent Order of the British Empire-Civil Division. In 1946, he received the first annual Award Medal of the Welfare Council for Distinguished Service to the Community. He was instrumental in establishing the Milbank Memorial Fund, an endowed operating foundation that works to improve health by helping decision makers in the public and private sectors acquire and use the best available evidence to inform policy for health care and population health. See www.milbank.org.
On March 16, 1933, at the annual dinner of the Milbank Memorial Fund at the New York Academy of Medicine, Milbank urged statewide compulsory health care insurance systems on a contributory basis of percentage of Employees' Pay and Employers' profits to defray the expenses. Also at the dinner, Dr. G.F. McCleary praised the British methods saying they raised medical standards in England (New York Times March 17, 1933).

Previous name partners

Harrison Tweed

Harrison Tweed became a member of Murray, Prentice & Aldrich, a predecessor of Milbank, in 1920. He also served as president of the American Law Institute, chaired the American Law Institutes's Committee on Continuing Legal Education in collaboration with the American Bar Association, and was also president of the Association of the Bar of the City of New York. In addition, he served as president of Sarah Lawrence College, president of the Legal Aid Society, and was appointed by President John F. Kennedy as the first chair of the Lawyers' Committee for Civil Rights Under Law.

Morris Hadley

Morris Hadley came to the firm in 1929. He represented many large corporations, both in the United States and abroad. He authored two books: one, a biography of his father who had been president of Yale University, and the other entitled The Citizen and the Law. Mr. Hadley was a trustee of the Russell Sage Foundation and also sat on the board of trustees of both the Pierpont Morgan Library and the New York Public Library where, from 1943 to 1958, he served as president.

John J. McCloy

John J. McCloy was originally a partner at Cravath, Swaine & Moore in New York, and joined what is today Milbank in 1946, after serving as Assistant Secretary of War from 1941 to 1945 under President Franklin Delano Roosevelt, during which time he was one of the architects of the United States' program of Japanese Internment. He left the firm in 1947 to serve as president of the World Bank, and was appointed by President Harry S. Truman as High Commissioner of Germany in 1949. In 1952, he returned to the private sector and served as chair of the Chase National Bank, which under his leadership became the Chase Manhattan Bank in 1955. During this period, he also served as chair of the Ford Foundation. He returned to Milbank in 1961, but was almost immediately appointed by President John F. Kennedy as his Special Assistant on Disarmament. McCloy also served as a member of the Warren Commission following the assassination of President Kennedy. He thereafter returned to Milbank, which was renamed Milbank, Tweed, Hadley & McCloy, and remained a general partner for 27 years, until he died in 1989.

At Milbank, McCloy acted for the "Seven Sisters" (the leading multinational oil companies, including Exxon), in their initial confrontations with the nationalisation movement in Libya-as well as negotiations with Saudi Arabia and OPEC. Because of his stature in the legal world and his long association with the Rockefellers, and as a seven-time presidential adviser, he is sometimes referred to as the "Chairman of the American Establishment."

Turks & Brahmins: upheaval at Milbank, Tweed
In 1990, Ellen Joan Pollock published Turks & Brahmins: Upheaval at Milbank, Tweed, a book chronicling Milbank's history and transformation into a high-grossing late-20th century megafirm.

The book notes that Milbank was at one time the largest law firm in the country, with a carefully nurtured "insular, noble culture." For 50 years, from 1931 to 1981, the firm never took on a lateral partner from another firm; all of its 65 or so partners had apprenticed with the firm from mostly Ivy league schools. Until 1984, no Milbank partner had ever left the firm to become a lateral-hire partner elsewhere. However, by 1984, the legal market had revolutionized as both new and old firms ballooned in size, dumped lockstep compensation for "merit" systems that rewarded achievers, raided each other for star players, and hustled ceaselessly for clients. Pollock's book narrates how, during the latter half of the 1980s, a determined group of partners transformed Milbank - more than doubling its size and luring on board such glamorous laterals as a former Abscam prosecutor Thomas Puccio and an Asian-business rainmaking lawyer, Alice Young. By 1989, profits per partner had doubled what they were in 1984, and the firm's overall revenues had tripled. The book chronicles the displacement and decay of what Tom Wolfe called "the old Protestant aristocracy" that once ruled the United States.

Office locations

New York headquarters
Milbank's New York office is the global headquarters of the firm. Located in New York City's Hudson Yards, the firm occupies 10 floors of the 55 Hudson Yards building. Milbank moved to Hudson Yards in February 2019 from its longtime headquarters at 28 Liberty (formerly One Chase Manhattan Plaza) in New York's Financial District.

Other United States offices
In addition to the firm's headquarters in New York City, Milbank maintains two offices in the United States.

Washington, D.C.
Milbank's Washington, D.C. practice combines the firm's traditional "Wall Street" practice - including a focus on complex international transactions and arbitrations and nationwide litigation - with experience in dealing with the federal government and the various multilateral institutions located in Washington.

Los Angeles
Milbank's Los Angeles office, located in the Century Plaza Towers, is the firm's largest domestic office outside of its New York City headquarters.

International offices
As counsel to foreign corporations with U.S. interests and U.S. corporations operating overseas, Milbank forged international relationships that endure today. In 1925, for example, the firm worked on a proposed Japanese bond issue for the Toho Electric Power Company. Fifty-two years later, in 1977, Milbank opened the first American law office in Tokyo, ten years before any other American law firm. Today, Milbank offices are located in key geographic regions to serve clients across the globe.

London
Milbank's London office opened in 1979 and today offers a range of services under both English and New York law. 

The firm is located at 100 Liverpool Street in the City of London, London's central business district. The building is among the top 1% of sustainable office buildings in the United Kingdom, according to the BRE Group, a building science and environmental certification body.

São Paulo
In 2010, Milbank launched an office in São Paulo, Brazil to better serve its Latin American and international clients doing business in Brazil and the region.

Asia/Pacific (Tokyo, Singapore, Beijing, Hong Kong, Seoul)

Milbank's commitment to Japan began in 1925, when founding partner Morris Hadley traveled to Yokohama to prepare an indenture for the Toho Electric Power Company.

In 1977, Milbank became the first U.S. law firm to establish an office in Tokyo under its own name, amid opposition from both the Ministry of Justice and Japan Federation of Bar Associations, who viewed it as illegal for foreign lawyers to practice in Japan at that time. Despite these protests, Milbank's office remained open through the early 1980s and was the only office of an American law firm in Japan during that time. Restrictions on foreign law firms in Japan were eased with the introduction of the attorney at foreign law system in 1987.

In the same year, Milbank became one of the first international law firms to open an office in Hong Kong. Milbank was again one of the first U.S. firms to open an office in Singapore, and did so in 1985. The firm opened its Beijing office in 2006, though it has been active in China since the early 1990s.

In early 2015, Milbank opened a Foreign Legal Consultant Office (FLCO) in Seoul. In Korea, the firm advises international and Korean corporations, financial institutions and government agencies on a variety of in-bound and out-bound transactions, including project finance, M&A and private equity investments, and disputes, as well as aviation and transportation finance.

Germany (Frankfurt, Munich)
The lawyers that make up Milbank's German practice in Frankfurt and Munich focus on legal advice in corporate, finance and tax matters.

The Frankfurt office was established in 2001, and the Munich office opened in 2004. The German offices work with Milbank's London and US offices to complete complex cross-border financing transactions.

See also
List of largest law firms by profits per partner

References

Further reading

Law firms based in New York City
Law firms established in 1866
Foreign law firms with offices in Hong Kong
Foreign law firms with offices in Japan
1866 establishments in New York (state)